Aleksandra Sergeyevna Soldatova (born 1 June 1998) is a retired Russian individual rhythmic gymnast. She is the 2018 World All-around bronze medalist, 2018 World ribbon champion, the 2016 Grand Prix Final All-around champion and the 2016 Russian National All-around champion. On the junior level, she is the 2012 European Junior ribbon champion and two-time Russian Junior National All-around medalist.

She was coached by Anna Shumilova-Dyachenko. On 24 December 2020, Soldatova announced that she had retired from competitive gymnastics.

Career

Junior  
Soldatova began training in rhythmic gymnastics at age five. She burst onto the junior international scene at the 2011 Junior Irina Deleanu Cup where she won gold medal in the all-around and event finals in hoop and ribbon, silver medal in ball. She then competed at the World Club Cup, the 2011 Aeon Cup in Tokyo, Japan, where she won the junior all-around gold together with Team Gazprom (seniors Evgenia Kanaeva and Daria Kondakova). At the Russian National Junior Championships, she won the bronze in 2012 and silver in 2013 in the all-around.

In 2012, Soldatova started her season at the 2012 Moscow Grand Prix. She won the all-around gold at the Schmiden International Tournament and all event finals before winning Team gold with Dina Averina and Arina Averina at the 2012 MTM Ljubljana. After winning gold in ribbon at the 2012 Pesaro Junior World Cup, she then won the all-around title at the 2012 Sofia Junior World Cup and the event finals. At the 2012 European Junior Championships, Soldatova won the gold medal in ribbon as well as helping the Russian junior team (with Yana Kudryavtseva, Julia Sinitsina and Diana Borisova) win the junior team gold medal.

Competing at the 2013 Russian Spartakiada's 6th Summer Student Games, Soldatova won the all-around gold ahead of the Averina twins, as well as gold in ribbon and silver in clubs and hoop. In October, she was the all-around gold medalist in the junior division in the Italian Serie A.

Senior

2014 season
In the 2014 season, due to Russia's repository of rhythmic gymnasts, Soldatova was part of the reserve team, and nevertheless made her senior debut competing in the senior international tournament division at the 2014 Moscow Grand Prix where she won the bronze medal in the All-around behind the Averina Twins (Dina and Arina). Soldatova was assigned to her first World Cup event after replacing Yulia Sinitsina in the entry list for the 2014 Debrecen World Cup where Soldatova finished 1st place in the all-around with a total score of 70.750 points, beating 2013 World Silver medalist Ganna Rizatdinova for the gold. In event finals, she won gold in clubs (18.067) and ribbon (17.633), silver in ball (17.583) and bronze in hoop (17.283) points. In 4–6 April, Soldatova competed at the 2014 Baltic Hoop where she won the all-around gold medal, teammate Arina Averina took the silver medal and bronze to Belarusian Katsiaryna Halkina. She won 3 gold medals in event finals: (in hoop, clubs, ribbon) and finished 4th in ball. In 23–27 April, Soldatova made her senior national appearance at the 2014 Russian Championships where she won the all-around bronze medal behind Yana Kudryavtseva (gold) and Margarita Mamun (silver). In 9–11 May, Soldatova competed in her second World Cup at the 2014 Corbeil-Essonnes World Cup where she finished 4th in all-around behind Ganna Rizatdinova, she qualified to 1 event final winning the silver medal in ball. Soldatova then competed at the 2014 Tashkent World Cup winning bronze in the all-around behind teammates Margarita Mamun and Yana Kudryavtseva who took the gold and silver medal respectively, she did not advance to the event finals due to the 2 gymnast per country rule, with Mamun and Kudryavtseva placing ahead of her in qualifications. In 4–6 July, Soldatova competed at the Izmir Tournament Cup and won the all-around gold ahead of teammate Maria Titova, she qualified to all 4 event finals and won gold in ribbon, 3 silver medals (hoop, ball and clubs). In 16–17 August, Soldatova was invited for an international competition meet in Vitoria, Brazil where she made a sweep of the gold medals with high scores in the all-around (71.500 points) and all event finals  (Hoop:18.150, Ball: 17.650, Clubs: 18.200, Ribbon: 18.000). In 22–28 September, Soldatova (along with teammates Yana Kudryavtseva and Margarita Mamun) represented Russia at the 2014 World Championships, she competed in only 2 apparatus, contributing scores of 17.675 (ball) and 18.050 (hoop) helping Russia win the Team gold medal with a total of 147.914 points. Soldatova did not advance to any event finals because of the 2 gymnast per country rule with Kudryavtseva and Mamun placed ahead of her in qualifications.

2015 season

Soldatova started her season competing at the 2015 Moscow Grand Prix where she finished 4th in the all-around. She qualified to 2 event finals, taking the gold medal in ball ahead of Melitina Staniouta and finished 7th in clubs. In 27–29 March, Soldatova competed at the 2015 Lisboa World Cup where she won the all-around gold with a total score of 73.600 points beating compatriots Margarita Mamun (silver) and Yana Kudryavtseva (bronze). She qualified to 3 event finals: won gold in clubs, silver in ball and placed 6th in hoop. Her next event, at the 2015 Lisboa World Cup, Soldatova finished 6th in all-around after mistakes and drop from her hoop routine, she qualified to 2 apparatus finals winning gold in ribbon (tied with Kudryavtseva) and silver in clubs. In 10–12 April, Soldatova won the all-around bronze at the 2015 Pesaro World Cup, she qualified to 2 event finals taking gold in ball and bronze in ribbon. Soldatova was selected as member of the Russian team to compete at the 2015 European Championships where they won Team gold (together with teammates Kudryavtseva and Margarita Mamun). Soldatova qualified to 2 apparatus however only placed 7th in hoop and 8th in clubs finals. In 15–26 May, Soldatova competed at the 2015 Holon Grand Prix, she won silver in ball and ribbon finals. At the 2015 Tashkent World Cup, Soldatova won the all-around silver behind Margarita Mamun, she qualified to all 4 apparatus finals, taking silver (in hoop, ball, ribbon) and placed 6th in clubs. Soldatova's next competition was at the 2015 Grand Prix Berlin where she won bronze in all-around behind Melitina Staniouta, she qualified to 3 event finals and won silver in (hoop, clubs, ribbon). In August, Soldatova competed at the  2015 Budapest World Cup finishing 4th in all-around behind Belarusian Melitina Staniouta, Soldatova only qualified to 1 event final placing 7th in ribbon. In her next competition, Soldatova finished 6th in the all-around at the 2015 Sofia World Cup and qualified to 1 event final taking silver in clubs behind teammate Kudryavtseva. At the 2015 World Cup series in Kazan, Soldatova won the all-around bronze medal with a total of 74.300 points. Soldatova qualified to clubs final, but was given the remaining apparatus finals being the 3rd Russian qualifier in scores, after Kudryavtseva's withdrawal from an ankle inflammation sustained in her clubs routine. Soldatova competed in the events suffering from a flu, nevertheless, she only made a few mistakes and won silver medals in Hoop (18.500), Ball (18.450), Clubs (18.300) and Ribbon (18.400) right behind teammate Margarita Mamun who won all the apparatus finals. In 9–13 September, At the 2015 World Championships in Stuttgart, Soldatova (together with teammates Kudryavtseva and Mamun) represented Russia where they won the Team gold. She competed in 3 apparatus in qualifications and qualified to 2 finals, winning the silver medal in hoop and clubs, she was ranked 3rd for the all-around; however she did not advance into the all-around finals because of the two-per country rule and with Kudryavsteva and Mamun ahead of her in qualification scores. In 2–4 October, Soldatova together with teammates Margarita Mamun and junior Alina Ermolova represented Team Gazprom at the 2015 Aeon Cup in Tokyo Japan, Soldatova won bronze in the individual all-around finals behind Ganna Rizatdinova and with Team Russia winning the gold medal in the overall standings. Soldatova qualified for the 2015 Grand Prix Final in Brno, but withdrew before the start of the competition because of fever.

2016 season
In 2016, Soldatova started her season at the 2016 Moscow Grand Prix where she won the all-around gold medal with a total of 74.066 points, she qualified to 3 apparatus finals taking gold in hoop, ball and a silver in ribbon. In 26–28 February, Soldatova competed in the first World Cup of the season at the 2016 Espoo World Cup where she won the all-around gold. In apparatus finals; she won gold in clubs, silver in hoop, bronze in ribbon, placed 4th in ball. On 17–20 March, Soldatova then competed at the 2016 Lisboa World Cup where she won the all-around gold with a total of 75.650 points (a new Personal Best). In event finals, she won gold in hoop, ball, silver in ribbon (tied with teammate Arina Averina) and bronze in clubs. At the 30th Thiais Grand Prix event in Paris, Soldatova won the all-around silver behind teammate Margarita Mamun, she qualified 3 apparatus finals: taking gold in ball, ribbon and silver in hoop. Soldatova won the all-around gold at the 2016 Russian Championships held in Sochi. On 13–15 May, Soldatova competed at the 2016 Tashkent World Cup where she won the all-around silver medal behind Yana Kudryavtseva, she qualified to 3 apparatus finals taking silver in hoop, clubs and ribbon. She won another silver medal in the all-around at the 2016 Minsk World Cup with a total of 74.200 points, in the event finals: she won 3 silver medals (ball, ribbon, clubs) and placed 7th in hoop.
 On 3–5 June, Soldatova then won silver in the all-around at the 2016 Guadalajara World Cup with a new PB score of 75.700 points, in apparatus finals: she won gold in ball, silver in hoop, clubs and bronze in ribbon. On 8–10 July, Soldatova won bronze in the all-around at the 2016 Kazan World Cup with a total of 75.500 points, she qualified to 1 apparatus final taking silver in clubs. On 22–24 July, culminating the World Cup of the season in 2016 Baku World Cup, Soldatova won another all-around bronze medal with a total of 75.850 points - updating her Personal Best, she qualified to 1 apparatus final; winning a silver in ball behind Margarita Mamun. Soldatova traveled as a reserve/alternate individual athlete in Russia's rhythmic gymnastics at the 2016 Summer Olympics held in Rio de Janeiro. On 9–11 September, Soldatova together with teammates Margarita Mamun and junior Maria Sergeeva represented team Gazprom at the annual 2016 Aeon Cup in Tokyo, where they won the team gold and with Soldatova taking bronze in individual all-around behind Ganna Rizatdinova. On 22–24 September, Soldatova culminated her season at the 2016 Grand Prix Final in Eilat, Israel, where she won the all-around gold earning a new personal best total of 77.033 points, she also swept gold in all the apparatus finals in Hoop (19.300), Ball (19.367), Clubs (19.200) and Ribbon (19.117).

2017 season
In 2017, Soldatova started her Post-Olympics season in competition at the 2017 Grand Prix Moscow where she won the all-around silver medal behind teammate Dina Averina, she qualified 2 apparatus finals winning the gold in ball and silver in hoop. On 10–12 March, Soldatova competed as the defending champion at the 2017 Russian Championships where she won the all-around silver medal behind Dina. On 31 March – 2 April, Soldatova competed at the 2017 Grand Prix Marbella where she won the all-around gold and swept the gold in all the event finals in hoop (19.350), ball (19.250), clubs (19.500), and ribbon (19.200). On 7–9 April, Soldatova competed in the first World Cup of the season at the 2017 Pesaro World Cup where she won gold in the all-around ahead of teammate Dina Averina, she qualified to all the apparatus finals taking gold in hoop, silver medals in ball, ribbon and placed 5th in clubs. Her next event at the 2017 Baku World Cup, Soldatova won silver in the all-around behind Arina Averina, she qualified to all the apparatus finals taking gold in ball, silver medals in hoop, clubs and placed 5th in ribbon. On 19–21 May, at the 2017 European Championships in Budapest, Hungary, Soldatova was member of the Golden winning Russian Team (together with senior individuals Dina Averina, Arina Averina and the junior group) scoring a total of 182.175 points which was more than 11 points ahead of their nearest competitor team Belarus. Soldatova qualified to 3 apparatus finals taking 2 silver medals in hoop, ball and finished 4th in ribbon behind Neviana Vladinova. Recovering from an ankle injury; Soldatova returned to competition on 4–6 August at the 2017 Minsk World Challenge Cup, she won gold in the all-around, she qualified in all 4 apparatus finals however mistake ridden routines and imprecise elements, after taking a silver in hoop behind Neviana Vladinova, she finished 5th in ball, 6th in clubs, 4th in ribbon in her latter 3 apparatus. On 9 August, during the Russian team's control training selection process for the 2017 Summer Universiade, Soldatova was not selected to represent Russia in the rhythmic gymnastics universiade participants, the 2 representatives were Iuliia Bravikova and Ekaterina Selezneva. Irina Viner has also stated that Soldatova will not participate at the 2017 World Championships as she has not fully recovered from her injury, she is still heavily recovering not just physically, but mentally.
On 5–6 November, Soldatova competed at the 2017 Dalia Kutkaite Cup winning the all-around gold with a total of 74.850 points, a 0.5 ahead of silver medalist Katsiaryna Halkina.

2018 season
In 2018, Soldatova started the season at the 2018 Grand Prix Moscow, where she placed 4th in all-around. She qualified to two apparatus finals, where she won silver with clubs and ribbon. At the 2018 Russian National Championships, she won the silver medal behind the defending champion Dina Averina.

On 30 March – 1 April, Soldatova began with the world cup events competing at the 2018 Sofia World Cup where she won the gold medal at the all-around. She qualified in all the apparatus finals, winning gold with hoop and ball, a bronze with clubs and finishing 4th with  ribbon. On 20–22 April, at the 2018 Tashkent World Cup, Soldatova won gold in the all-around posting a new personal best total of 77.050 points. She swept all the gold medals in the apparatus finals with high scores in hoop(19.900), ball(19.600), clubs(18.000) and ribbon(18.300). On 4–6 May, Soldatova competed at the 2018 Guadalajara World Challenge Cup where she won silver in the all-around (72.750) behind Linoy Ashram. She qualified in all apparatus finals however mistakes with hoop and ball led to 6th and 7th place respectively in those finals. She still won silver in clubs behind Arina Averina and won gold in the last event with ribbon (18.650).

On 16–17 May, Soldatova competed at the 2018 Holon Grand Prix and won silver in the all-around with a total of 75.750 points behind teammate Arina Averina. She qualified for the hoop and clubs finals. However she withdrew from the events schedule due to injury, and it was later revealed she sustained a fracture in her left leg. She was in an orthopedic cast and was off the carpet for 4 weeks, then resumed training in early July, joining the Russian national training camp in Croatia.

2019 season 
Soldatova won four gold medals at the Tashkent World Cup in April 2019, and five gold medals at the 2019 Guadalajara World Challenge Cup in early May. On 19 May 2019, she won two silver medals - in ball and ribbon - at the European Championships in Baku. In September at the Portimão World Challenge Cup, Soldatova won the all-around gold.

2020 season 
Russian media reported that on 5 February Soldatova was taken to the Sklifosovskiy Institute in Moscow due to injuries on her left arm from a suicide attempt. At the hospital she was diagnosed with bulimia. Soldatova later stated through her coach's Instagram account that she had accidentally cut herself with a knife while making breakfast and gone to the hospital. In February 2020, she revealed that she would take time off to receive treatment for bulimia, which she had been suffering from for the past two years, and wanted to begin training again once she became healthy.

Soldatova did not compete during the 2020 season, which was curtailed due to the coronavirus pandemic. She announced her retirement from gymnastics on 24 December 2020.

Gymnastics technique 
Soldatova was known for her flexible body difficulties and pivot turns, she has executed a quintuple penchee turn and a quadruple ring pivot in competitions. She can also complete a quadruple double backscale pivot.

Routine music information

Competitive highlights
(Team competitions in seniors are held only at the World Championships, Europeans and other Continental Games.)

References

External links

 
 

1998 births
Living people
People from Sterlitamak
Russian rhythmic gymnasts
Medalists at the Rhythmic Gymnastics World Championships
Medalists at the Rhythmic Gymnastics European Championships
Sportspeople from Bashkortostan